A choriovitelline placenta is a placenta formed by the yolk sac and chorion. In a choriovitelline placenta, the yolk sac fuses with the chorion and, subsequently, wrinkles develop that hold the embryo to the uterine wall, thus forming the choriovitelline placenta. The chorionic blood vessels are connected with the vitelline blood vessel of the yolk sac. 

It is a primitive type of placenta found in all marsupials. (However, bandicoots also have a chorioallantoic placenta.) A choriovitelline placenta also forms early in the development of some placental mammals before the chorioallantoic placenta forms and the choriovitelline placenta is resorbed.

References 

Mammal anatomy
Marsupials
Embryology